Bleeke Bet  is a 1934 Dutch comedy film directed by Alex Benno and Richard Oswald.

Cast
Aaf Bouber	... 	Bleeke Bet
Jopie Koopman	... 	Jans
Johan Elsensohn	... 	Tinus
Fien de la Mar	... 	Ka (as Fientje de la Mar)
Johannes Heesters	... 	Ko Monje (as Johan Heesters)
Sylvain Poons	... 	Sally
Clara Vischer-Blaaser	... 	Trui (as Clara Fischer)
Lau Ezerman	... 	Lucas (as Lou Ezerman)
Corry Vonk	... 	Leentje (as Corrie Vonk)
Cor Hermus	... 	Van Santen
Jan Lemaire Jr.	... 	Hannes
Jan Van Ees	... 	Max

External links 
 

1934 films
Dutch black-and-white films
1934 comedy films
Films directed by Alex Benno
Films directed by Richard Oswald
Dutch comedy-drama films
1930s Dutch-language films